Traversella is a comune (municipality) in the Metropolitan City of Turin in the Italian region Piedmont, located Metropolitan Cityabout  north of Turin.

Traversella borders the following municipalities: Pontboset, Donnas, Valprato Soana, Quincinetto, Ronco Canavese, Tavagnasco, Brosso, Valchiusa, Ingria, Frassinetto and Castelnuovo Nigra.

References

External links
Official website

Cities and towns in Piedmont